Giovanni Marracci (1637–1704) was an Italian Baroque painter who after training with Pietro da Cortona in Rome, worked in his home region of Lucca where he painted many altarpieces.

Biography
Among his masterpieces are Madonna and Child with Saints in Pescaglia and Coronation of Santa Teresa (now in National Museum of Villa Guinigi in Lucca). He also frescoed the cupola of the chapel of Sant'Ignazio in the church of San Giovanni in Lucca. He painted a St Francis adoring the Virgin for the church of the Monache dell’Angelo, and frescoed a Nativity for the main door of the interior of the church of San Giusto. The frescoes on the main door of Santa Maria Corteorlandini are also attributed to him. He painted the altarpiece of St Thomas of the Tribune church. He painted seven large canvases for the library of San Giorgio Maggiore in Venice, and also painted for the Galleria Colonna in Rome.

One of his pupils was Gaetano Vetturali. His brother, Ippolito Marracci, painted quadratura.

Sources

External links

1637 births
1704 deaths
17th-century Italian painters
Italian male painters
18th-century Italian painters
Italian Baroque painters
Painters from Lucca
18th-century Italian male artists